The Mike Rose Soccer Complex is a complex of 16 soccer fields and one 2,500-capacity stadium located in Memphis, Tennessee.

The complex and stadium were completed in 2001 at a cost of around $4 million. The complex is home to many clubs in the Memphis area as well as  several regional tournaments.   The largest cross country race at night known as the Memphis Twilight Invitational is held here as well.

It served as the home of the Memphis Tigers men's and women's soccer from 2001 to 2018. They then moved to the on-campus soccer & track stadium in 2019.

References

External links
 Official Site
 ETI Page

Sports venues in Memphis, Tennessee
Soccer venues in Tennessee
National Premier Soccer League stadiums
Sports complexes in the United States